KLSD (1360 AM) is a commercial radio station in San Diego, California. It is owned by iHeartMedia and broadcasts a talk format branded "The Patriot AM 1360".  The radio studios and offices are on Granite Ridge Drive in the Serra Mesa neighborhood on the northeast side.  Nationally syndicated shows heard on KLSD include Glenn Beck, Jessy Kelly, Dana Loesch, Mark Levin, Chad Benson, Red Eye Radio and America in the Morning.

The station operates with 5,000 watts by day and 1,000 watts at night using a non-directional antenna.  It shares a broadcasting tower with co-owned KGB-FM and KHTS-FM on 52nd Street in the Oak Park neighborhood of San Diego.  Programming is also heard on FM translator K277DH at 103.3 MHz.  KLSD is San Diego's oldest licensed radio station, dating back to 1922, and using the call sign KGB for most of its history.

History

As KFBC (1922–1928)
Founded by W.K. Azbill in his home in the Normal Heights neighborhood of San Diego, it first signed on the air as KFBC on July 14, 1922, broadcasting on 833.3 kHz (360 meters) with 10 watts of power and sharing the time with eight other San Diego radio stations. To date, the station that is now KLSD remains the oldest, continuously licensed radio station in San Diego.

In September 1926, the Union League Club of San Diego County leased the station full-time from Azbill. Later that year, physician Arthur Wells Yale bought KFBC and all Union League properties, and the station moved to the Balboa Theatre in Downtown San Diego. As the government expanded the AM band to numerous frequencies, the station soon moved to 1210 kHz in 1927.

As KGB (1928–1982)

At the request of vice president George Bowles, the KFBC call sign was changed to KGB on March 27, 1928. Then on July 11 that year, the Pickwick Stages System bought the station. By December, KGB became an affiliate of Don Lee's radio network.

The Pickwick Stages System became the Pickwick Broadcasting System in January 1929. KGB became a full-time CBS Radio Network affiliate as did all Don Lee stations. KGB began having a slogan "Music for the Sick", reflecting that its programming targeted people who had to stay home due to illness. Don Lee bought KGB outright on May 9, 1931. KGB also regularly broadcast Gus Arnheim concerts.

On August 5, 1932, the Federal Radio Commission authorized KGB to increase its power from 500 watts to 1,000 watts. At that time the station operated on 1330 kHz.

Future CBS and NBC broadcaster Art Linkletter began his broadcasting career in 1933 as an announcer for KGB. He was promoted to program director in 1934 and station manager in 1936. Linkletter also developed his "Man on the Street" audience participation shows while with KGB. Don Lee died in 1934, and his son Thomas S. Lee became president of the Don Lee company.

In 1936, KGB switched its network affiliation from CBS to the Mutual Broadcasting System. Around the same time, future television screenwriter Larry Rhine became a screenwriter and morning host for KGB. KGB also began a middle of the road music format.

On March 24, 1941, under the North American Regional Broadcasting Agreement, KGB was moved from 1330 to its present 1360 kHz. During World War II, KGB featured content relating to the U.S. military. The United States Navy broadcast ship signals on the station, and KGB hosted shows originating from the Marine Corps Recruit Depot and Naval Training Center San Diego. Those shows featured the United States Marine Corps with film stars such as Ginger Rogers and Henry Fonda as special guests. In this era, KGB was the most popular radio station in San Diego, with local car dealers being the top sponsors.

On December 27, 1950, the General Tire and Rubber Company bought KGB as part of a $12.3 million purchase including all Thomas S. Lee properties and interest in the Mutual Broadcasting System.
The broadcast license transferred to Marion R. Harris in 1954 and KGB Inc. in 1956. In April 1959, KGB moved from the Mutual Broadcasting System to ABC Radio Network.

On April 1, 1964, Willet Brown bought KGB. Then in 1965, KGB became the first client of the Drake-Chenault consulting company and changed to the Boss Radio Top 40 music format. Nearly two months into retaining Drake-Chenault, KGB had its ratings improve from worst to best in San Diego.

In 1972, KGB became an early adopter and pioneer of what is now called the album oriented rock format, simulcasting with co-owned KGB-FM. KGB-AM returned to Top 40 in 1974.

News and adult standards (1982–2004)
On March 15, 1982, KGB's call sign changed to KCNN, and the format changed to an audio simulcast of CNN. General manager Jim Price explained the format change on the grounds that listeners preferred listening to music on FM radio. However, KCNN struggled in the ratings, never rising above a 2.3 share.

Then on October 7, 1983, KCNN became KPQP with an adult standards format. The call sign changed to KPOP on August 1, 1986.

Nearly four decades of local ownership ended in 1996, when Nationwide Communications bought KPOP. Nationwide was later acquired by Jacor in 1997. Then in 1998, Clear Channel Communications bought Jacor and its stations including KPOP.

Beginning in the 2000–01 season, KPOP became the radio home of San Diego State Aztecs men's basketball. In June 2001, former KFMB Hudson and Bauer co-host Joe Bauer became morning drive host of Breakfast with Bauer at KPOP. In 2002, KPOP added a rotating set of lifestyle programs at 6 p.m. weeknights.

Progressive talk (2004–2007)
The station became a progressive talk station under the call sign KLSD on August 23, 2004. The call sign reportedly stood for "Liberal San Diego".

Most of the programming came from the Air America Radio Network. KLSD also aired the Ed Schultz show from Jones Radio Network and Mike Malloy from Nova M Radio. Local programming included the morning show, hosted by Stacy Taylor and the nationally syndicated Air America host Jon Elliott.

In August 2005, Clear Channel applied to the FCC to increase KLSD's power to 50,000 watts day and night, planning to share the six-tower KSDO array in Santee, California, since the owners of KLSD also owned the broadcast site for KSDO. However, due to the added cost, Clear Channel decided against the move, and KLSD still broadcasts at 5,000 watts day/1,000 watts night.

As a sports station (2007–2022)

After registering a 2.2 rating in the winter 2006–07 period, KLSD's ratings declined to 0.9 and 1.0 for the spring and summer 2007 ratings books, according to Arbitron.
In an August 31, 2007 article, San Diego Union-Tribune sports reporter Jay Posner found that Clear Channel registered the domain name "xtrasports1360.com", sparking speculation that the company would change KLSD to a sports format. The blog SDRadio.net hinted at a format change nearly a week earlier August 23.

Following the SDRadio.net report, listeners organized and held rallies to attempt to persuade Clear Channel to keep the format. A documentary titled Save KLSD: Media Consolidation and Local Radio was made about the effort.

Posner reported for the Union-Tribune on October 13, 2007 that Clear Channel planned on changing KLSD to sports.

On November 12, 2007, KLSD flipped to the new format as XTRA Sports 1360, inheriting the former branding from XETRA-AM, which would change its callsign to XEWW a month later. The first local live program, which aired at 3 p.m. that day, was hosted by Lee Hacksaw Hamilton. Outside of local programming, the new XTRA Sports broadcast the national Fox Sports Radio network.

In 2008, KLSD broadcast select San Diego State Aztecs baseball. Hacksaw left the station in 2008 when his contract was not renewed.

KLSD was not listed in the Arbitron ratings book in the winter 2007–08 period. KLSD returned to the Arbitron ratings books in June 2009 with an 0.6 share. The ratings would remain around that level in the final months of 2009.

Beginning in the 2009–10 season, KLSD became the San Diego affiliate for the Los Angeles Lakers.

On July 21, 2014, KLSD rebranded as "Xtra 1360 Fox Sports San Diego" as a partnership with the Fox Sports San Diego TV network.

In September 2014, Clear Channel Communications became iHeartMedia.

On May 8, 2017, KLSD and sister station KGB-FM signed a contract with San Diego State University to broadcast San Diego State Aztecs football and men's basketball after the previous contract with XEPRS-AM "The Mighty 1090" expired.

Beginning in the fall of 2020, KLSD began broadcasting some ESPN Radio programming during the week, with ESPN Radio's East Coast morning drive show Keyshawn, JWill, and Zubin weekdays at 3 a.m. and weekend mornings to noon.

Conservative talk (2022–present) 
On August 31, 2022, iHeartMedia announced that it would swap the formats of 760 KGB and KLSD at midnight the next day, with KGB's nationally syndicated conservative talk shows moving to the 1360 AM signal and KLSD's sports programming moving to KGB on 760 AM. The swap, timed to coincide with the beginning of the college football season, moved San Diego State football and the other sports programming to a stronger signal. 

KLSD was rebranded "1360 the Patriot" beginning September 1 with an all-syndicated lineup including The Glenn Beck Program and The Mark Levin Show. Mark Larson and Mike Slater, hosts previously on KGB, moved to KOGO.

References

Works cited

 
Notes

External links
The Patriot AM 1360 official website

San Diego, California antenna sites 2005

LSD
RKO General
Radio stations established in 1922
1922 establishments in California
 Talk radio stations in the United States
IHeartMedia radio stations
Conservative talk radio